Maharashtra Airport Development Company Limited abbreviated as (MADC), is a Special Purpose Company constituted in 2002 by the Government of Maharashtra (GoM) to plan, construct, operate and maintain airports in the State. The government has entrusted MADC the task of developing three `greenfield' and six `brownfield' airports, and a heliport at Gadchiroli.
MADC was also to play a lead role in the planning and implementation of the Multi-modal International Cargo Hub and Airport at Nagpur (MIHAN) project,

In April 2017, a report by the Comptroller and Auditor General of India (CAG) criticised the MADC for not developing a single airport in the state due to absence of a long-term plan, despite 14 years of its existence. The report also stated that Grants given by the state government for development of airports were lying unused, thus "blocking up" the public money.

Keeping in mind all the key objectives, MADC was formed with equity participation from City and Industrial Development Corporation Ltd. (CIDCO), Nagpur Improvement Trust (NIT), Maharashtra Industrial Development Corporation (MIDC), Maharashtra State Road Development Corporation Ltd. (MSRDC) and the Nagpur Municipal Corporation (NMC). The master plan of MIHAN consists of a Special Economic Zone comprising an Information Technology City, a Health City, a Captive Power Plant and other Manufacturing and Value Added units.

Other Projects

Existing Airports
The MADC has been tasked with developing some existing airports in  Non-Metropolitan regions of Maharashtra. These are :
 Amravati Airport 
 Chandrapur Airstrip
 Dhule Airport
 Jalgaon Airport
 Karad Airport 
 Phaltan Airstrip 
 Solapur Airport

The remaining airports in the State of Maharashtra continue to remain under the jurisdiction of the MIDC.

Greenfield Airports

The Government has approved proposals for developing three greenfield airports. 
 Shirdi Airport
 Chhatrapati Sambhaji Raje International Airport near Purandhar in Pune district
 Boramani International Airport in Solapur

See also
 MADC-Official Website
 Multi-modal International Cargo Hub and Airport at Nagpur (MIHAN)
 Nagpur Improvement Trust (NIT)
 Nagpur
 Vidarbha
 Maharashtra Industrial Development Corporation (MIDC)
 Airports Authority of India (AAI)
 Nagpur Airport

References

External links
 The Gazette of India, SEZ Act 2005

Economy of Nagpur
Vidarbha
 
Proposed infrastructure in Maharashtra
State agencies of Maharashtra
2002 establishments in Maharashtra
Indian companies established in 2002